Sarre can refer to:

 Sarre (département), a former French département, now part of Germany
 Sarre, Aosta Valley, a town in Italy
 Sarre, Kent, a village in the United Kingdom
 Sarre river or Saar, a river in France and Germany
 Sarre (Bode), a river of Saxony-Anhalt, Germany, tributary of the Bode
 La Sarre, a town in Quebec, Canada

People with that surname
 Georges Sarre (1935–2019), French politician
 Ronald Sarre (1932–2009), Australian cricketer
 Tony Sarre, Australian filmmaker

See also
 Sarre-Union, a commune of the Bas-Rhin département in Alsace, France
 Guidio-Sarre, a village in the Mopti Region of southern-central Mali